CJ2 may refer to:

Jeep CJ-2 land vehicle
Cessna CitationJet CJ2 aircraft
China Railways CJ2 an intercity high-speed train operate in China